Omar Camporese and Goran Ivanišević were the defending champions but withdrew on the semifinals in order to focus on the singles tournament, in which both players reached the Final.

Neil Broad and David Macpherson won the title by defeating Sergio Casal and Emilio Sánchez 5–7, 7–5, 6–4 in the final.

Seeds

Draw

Draw

References

External links
 Official results archive (ATP)
 Official results archive (ITF)

Milan Indoor
1992 ATP Tour
Milan